Richard d'Avranches, 2nd Earl of Chester (1094 – 25 November 1120) was the son of Hugh d'Avranches, 1st Earl of Chester, and his wife, Ermentrude of Clermont.

Early life
He was seven years old when his father, known as Hugh the Fat, died. Due to his age, a stewardship would have ruled until he was old enough. He probably became Earl of Chester in 1107. He married Lucia-Mahaut, daughter of Stephen, Count of Blois and Adela of Normandy, daughter of William the Conqueror.

Military career 
At the age of twenty, in 1114, Richard was on a military campaign and was styled the Earl of Chester. Together with King Alexander of Scotland, he led an Anglo-Norman army into Gwynedd as part of a three-pronged campaign organised by Henry I of England against Gwynedd, and Gruffudd ap Cynan. Gruffudd, rather than risk battle, satisfied the King with an oath of homage and a suitable fine. The campaign soon fizzled out, and Richard returned to Chester.

White Ship
The line of the d'Avranches as Earls of Chester failed when Richard, his wife, and his illegitimate half-brother Ottuel, joined the young William Adelin, heir to the English King Henry aboard the doomed White Ship. The captain, unwisely, chose to race out of the harbour. The ship struck a submerged rocky embankment, capsized and sank. Richard, aged twenty-six, his wife Lucia-Mahaut, and half-brother Ottuel all drowned.

The earldom then passed through his father Hugh's sister Maud to Richard's first cousin Ranulph I, in 1121, because Hugh had no other suitable male heirs.

References

Sources

1094 births
1120 deaths
Anglo-Normans in Wales
Norman warriors
Deaths on the White Ship
02